Jim Middelburg (born 6 January 1993) is a Dutch badminton player. Born in Delft, Middelburg had been training in DKC badminton club, then he moved to SV VELO. In 2011, he won bronze medal at the European Junior Badminton Championships in the mixed doubles event with his partner Soraya de Visch Eijbergen.

Achievements

European Junior Championships 
Mixed doubles

BWF International Challenge/Series 
Men's doubles

Mixed doubles

  BWF International Challenge tournament
  BWF International Series tournament
  BWF Future Series tournament

References

External links 
 

1993 births
Living people
Sportspeople from Delft
Dutch male badminton players